Nigel Pickering (born Fredy Ray Pickering; June 15 1929 - May 5 2011) was an American folk rock musician, who co-founded and was a songwriter for Spanky And Our Gang.

Career 
Nigel Pickering was born Fredy Ray Pickering in 1929 in Pontiac, Missouri. Pickering began his music career playing guitar on the radio with a Milwaukee group called "The Westernaires" in the mid 1950s. Their show was called "Ranch House Roundup" and he was the character "Ranger Tom."

Prior to being in Our Gang, Nigel was a member of the folk trio The Folksters, whom appeared on a 1962 episode of The Tonight Show With Johnny Carson. The trio included Kenny Hodges, who later played in Spanky And Our Gang. Pickering first met Spanky McFarlane and Oz Bach at a Hurricane party in Chicago, Illinois in 1965. The three, along with Malcom Hale and John Seiter, formed Spanky And Our Gang, best known for songs such as Lazy Day, Sunday Will Never Be The Same, and Like To Get To Know You that were produced between 1967 and 1969. The group came to an abrupt end in 1969, following the death of Malcom Hale on October 30 1968.

After the split of Our Gang, Nigel continued to perform as a solo act in clubs. He stopped playing guitar in the late 2000s due to arthritis, but continued to sing. After fighting liver cancer, he died on May 5, 2011 aged 81 in Saint Augustine, Florida.

References

Further reading
 

1929 births
2011 deaths
People from Ozark County, Missouri
People from St. Augustine, Florida
American folk rock musicians
American guitarists